Errol Spence Jr. vs. Yordenis Ugás was a professional boxing welterweight unification bout between WBC and IBF welterweight champion Errol Spence Jr., and WBA (Super) welterweight champion, Yordenis Ugás. The fight took place on April 16, 2022.

Fight card

Broadcasting 
The bout was broadcast live on Showtime, on pay-per-view.

References 

Boxing matches
2022 in boxing
April 2022 sports events in the United States
Boxing on Showtime
2022 in sports in Texas
Boxing in Texas